Areyonga is a genus of the parasitic wasp family Ichneumonidae. It currently consists of only one species, Areyonga eremica, from Australia.

The genus has a few distinguishing features: it lacks  occipital carina, the lower mandibular tooth is reduced to a vestigial state, and the segments at the base of the flagellum of each antenna are short 'annellar-like'.
The describing author Gauld inferred that it was related to the genus Probles.

References

External links
Species List

Ichneumonidae genera
Hymenoptera of Australia